Jennifer Rode (born 3 August 1995) is a German handball player for Borussia Dortmund and the German national team.

She participated at the 2015 World Women's Handball Championship.

References

1995 births
Living people
German female handball players
Handball players from Berlin